
This is a list of time zone abbreviations. 

Time zones are often represented by alphabetic abbreviations such as "EST", "WST", and "CST", but these are not part of the international time and date standard ISO 8601 and their use as sole designator for a time zone is discouraged. Such designations can be ambiguous; for example, "CST" can mean China Standard Time (UTC+8), Cuba Standard Time (UTC−5), and (North American) Central Standard Time (UTC−6), and it is also a widely used variant of ACST (Australian Central Standard Time, UTC+9:30). Such designations predate both ISO 8601 and the internet era; in an earlier era, they were sufficiently unambiguous for many practical uses within a national context (for example, in railway timetables and business correspondence), but their ambiguity explains their deprecation in the internet era, when communications more often cannot rely on implicit geographic context to supply part of the meaning.

See also
 List of tz database time zones
 List of military time zones
 Lists of time zones
 Time zone abolition

References

Notes

External links
 Greenwich Mean Time (GMT) :: UTC :
 MHonArc Resources: TIMEZONES
 
 AIX time zone table
 Time Zone Abbreviations